Tiddas were an all-female folk trio from Victoria, Australia.

Biography

1990–1992: Career beginnings and Inside My Kitchen

Originally the three women, Amy Saunders (a Gunditjmara woman from Portland), Lou Bennett (a Yorta Yorta Dja Dja Wurrung woman from Echuca) and Sally Dastey (from West Heidelberg) combined their vocal talents as backing singers for Aboriginal band Djaambi, led by Saunders' brother Richard Frankland in 1990. The group were invited to perform at a musical celebration for women's artistic achievement, 'Hot Jam Cooking', in Richmond, Victoria. Their performance was well received and inspired Ruby Hunter to dub the trio Tiddas, which is Koori for the "sisters".

After performing together for over a year the band came to the attention of Paul Petran, host of ABC National Radio show 'Music Deli', who assisted Tiddas to record their debut EP, Inside My Kitchen in 1991. Inside My Kitchen was released in October 1992 and received two nominations, for 'Best New Talent' and 'Best Indigenous Release', at the ARIA Music Awards of 1993.

1993–1997: Sing About Life and Tiddas

Tiddas quickly became live favourites, touring with Sweet Honey in the Rock and Midnight Oil, adding didgeridoo player Tim "Froggie" Holtze for their first studio album Sing About Life which was released in November 1993. The album peaked at No. 36 on the ARIA charts, achieved gold record sales in Australia (35,000 copies sold), was nominated 'Breakthrough Artist – Album', and won 'Best Indigenous Record' at the ARIA Music Awards of 1994. National and international tours followed, including several WOMAD concerts. Sing About Life was released in the United States in September 1995, spurring tours of North America and Europe.

The group's second studio album was produced by Joe Camilleri titled Tiddas and was released in Australia in August 1996 reaching No. 26 on the ARIA charts. The album was nominated for 'Best Indigenous Release' at the ARIA Music Awards of 1997. The first single, "Ignorance is Bliss", was reputedly inspired by an argument with Bob Geldof while touring in 1993. Backing musicians on the album included the Black Sorrows' Jen Anderson on violin, Joe Camilleri on sax (on "Waving Goodbye"), Peter Luscombe on drums, Steve Hadley on bass, and Weddings, Parties, Anything's Mark "Squeezebox Wally" Wallace on piano accordion. A second single "Walk Alone" was released in 1997.

1998–2000: Lethal By the Kilo, Show Us Ya Tiddas and split

In 1998, the girls sang on "Yil Lull" which was released as Singers For The Red Black & Gold. The third studio album, Lethal By the Kilo, was recorded in Melbourne's ABC studios in late 1998. The album received almost no promotion from the record company and failed to chart. On 11 September 1999, Tiddas recorded a live performance at Continental Café which was released as Show Us Ya Tiddas later in 1999.

In May 2000 Tiddas announced they were to break up, and spent months on a national tour to say farewell to their fans. In 2000 Tiddas were awarded a Deadly Award for 'Outstanding Contribution to Aboriginal Music'.

2018: Reformation and NIMA Hall of Fame
In 2018, the trio announced they were reuniting for a one-off national tour to celebrate the release of Archie Roach's “lost” album, Dancing with My Spirit, which was recorded in the 1990s and released in April 2018.

In August 2019, Tiddas were inducted into the National Indigenous Music Awards Hall of Fame.

Awards and nominations

ARIA Awards
The ARIA Music Awards are a set of annual ceremonies presented by Australian Recording Industry Association (ARIA), which recognise excellence, innovation, and achievement across all genres of the music of Australia. They commenced in 1987. Tiddas has received one ARIA Music Awards from six nominations

|-
| rowspan="2"| 1993 || rowspan="2"| Inside My Kitchen || Best New Talent ||  
|-
| Best Indigenous Release ||  
|-
| rowspan="2"| 1994 || rowspan="2"| Sing About Life || Best Indigenous Release ||  
|-
| Breakthrough Artist - Album ||  
|-
| rowspan="1"| 1995 || rowspan="1"| "Changing Times" || Best Indigenous Release ||  |
|-
| rowspan="1"| 1997 || rowspan="1"| Tiddas || Best Indigenous Release ||  
|-

Australian Women in Music Awards
The Australian Women in Music Awards is an annual event that celebrates outstanding women in the Australian Music Industry who have made significant and lasting contributions in their chosen field. They commenced in 2018.

|-
| 2018
| Tiddas 
| Auriel Andrew Memorial Award 
|

Deadly Awards
The Deadly Awards, (commonly known simply as The Deadlys), was an annual celebration of Australian Aboriginal and Torres Strait Islander achievement in music, sport, entertainment and community. They ran from 1996 to 2013.

|-
| Deadly Awards 1996
| "themselves"
| Band of the Year
| 
|-
| Deadly Awards 1997
| "Ignorance is Bliss"
| Single Release of the Year
| 
|-
| Deadly Awards 1999
| "My Island Home" 
| Excellence in Film or Theatrical Score
| 
|-
| Deadly Awards 2000
| "themselves"
| Outstanding Contribution to Music
| 
|-

National Indigenous Music Awards
The National Indigenous Music Awards (NIMA) recognise excellence, dedication, innovation and outstanding contribution to the Northern Territory music industry. They commenced in 2004.

|-
| National Indigenous Music Awards 2019
| themselves
| Hall of Fame Inductee
| 
|-

Members
 Sally Dastey
 Amy Saunders
 Lou Bennett

Discography

Studio albums

Live albums

Extended plays

Singles

References 

ARIA Award winners
Indigenous Australian musical groups
Victoria (Australia) musical groups
Musical groups established in 1990
Musical groups disestablished in 2000